Eduardo José Sosa Vegas (born 20 June 1996) is a Venezuelan professional footballer who currently plays for Deportes Tolima.

Career

Zamora FC
Sosa made his debut with Zamora on 10 November 2013, before making over 59 appearances, scoring 8 goals and tallying 6 assists in all competitions for the club.

Columbus Crew SC
Sosa signed with Major League Soccer side Columbus Crew SC on 9 January 2018. Columbus opted not to renew his contract at the end of the 2019 season

References

External links
 
 

1996 births
Living people
People from Barinas (state)
Venezuelan footballers
Venezuelan expatriate footballers
Association football midfielders
Columbus Crew players
Zamora FC players
Inter Miami CF II players
Jaguares de Córdoba footballers
Venezuelan Primera División players
Major League Soccer players
Categoría Primera A players
Venezuelan expatriate sportspeople in the United States
Venezuelan expatriate sportspeople in Colombia
Expatriate soccer players in the United States
Expatriate footballers in Colombia
21st-century Venezuelan people